Logan Cunningham (born May 30, 1991) is an American track and field athlete who specializes in the pole vault.

From Texas, Cunningham attended Smithson Valley High School before enrolling at Texas State University in 2009. He competed collegiately for the Texas State Bobcats. At the NCAA Men's Division I Outdoor Track and Field Championships he was fourth in 2011, but failed to record a mark at the 2012 event. He was also a finalist at the 2012 and 2013 NCAA Men's Division I Indoor Track and Field Championships. At regional level, he won one Western Athletic Conference title and one Southland Conference title.

On his international debut at the 2012 NACAC Under-23 Championships in Athletics he won the bronze medal. Cunningham reached new heights in the 2014 season, clearing  in March. This made him the third highest ranked American vaulter that year, behind Mark Hollis and Sam Kendricks. Having failed to record a height at the 2012 United States Olympic Trials and the 2013 USA Outdoor Track and Field Championships, he finally placed at the competition at the 2014 USA Indoor Championships, coming fourth and still competing without sponsor. At the Outdoor Championships he fell back to last place in twelfth.

Cunningham missed the 2015 outdoor season and on his return placed lowly at the 2016 USA Indoors in 13th. He reached  at the 2016 United States Olympic Trials which brought him a place on the U.S. Olympic team.

Major competitions

References

External links

 Logan Cunningham Athlete Biz Page
 Logan Cunningham Page Team USA

Living people
1991 births
Track and field athletes from Texas
American male pole vaulters
Texas State Bobcats athletes
Texas State University alumni
People from Comal County, Texas
Athletes (track and field) at the 2016 Summer Olympics
Olympic track and field athletes of the United States